Pseudowollastonite is a high-temperature mineral phase of CaSiO3 and is polymorphous with wollastonite.  Its formula can alternatively be written as Ca3Si3O9. Other names include ß-Wollastonite, and  cyclowollastonite.

It occurs in high temperature (pyrometamorphic) environments such as the Hatrurim Formation of the Negev Desert and the graphite mine at Pfaffenrenth near Hauzenberg, Bavaria. It also occurs in slags and cement.

References

Calcium minerals
Cyclosilicates
Monoclinic minerals
Minerals in space group 15